Edson Aparecido de Souza (born 29 November 1962), known as just Edson, is a former Brazilian football player.

Club statistics

References

External links

1962 births
Living people
Brazilian footballers
Brazilian expatriate footballers
Japan Soccer League players
J1 League players
Japan Football League (1992–1998) players
Japan Football League players
Tokyo Verdy players
Shonan Bellmare players
Tokyo Musashino United FC players
Expatriate footballers in Japan
Association football midfielders
Footballers from São Paulo